Real Men is a two-part British television crime drama series, written by playwright Frank Deasy and directed by Sallie Aphramain, that first broadcast on BBC Two on 12 and 13 March 2003. The series stars Ben Daniels as Detective Inspector Matthew Fenton, who after re-opening the cold case of a missing child, finds himself drawn to a local orphanage where he suspects the caretaker of sexual improprieties with the minors. The script for the series took writer Frank Deasy more than four years to write.

The series was considered so-hard hitting that the Radio Times published an article on the week of the programme's broadcast, entitled A fit subject for drama?. The series has never been repeated, nor released on DVD.

Production
Daniels commented on the role of Fenton; "Fenton is a deeply moral man, he's likable and kind. But, best of all for an actor, he really changes during the course of this piece. I love the fact that as the drama progresses, his veneer of perfection cracks. We gradually see that he's quite arrogant and emotionally stunted."

Producer David Snodin praised Deasy, writing "The moment I started reading it, I couldn't put it down. By exploring the links between the perpetrators of abuse and their victims, I believe that Real Men provides the deepest examination of this subject in a drama to date. This piece is drenched in truth, so it can't be exploitative. Frank's writing may be dangerous and close to the bone, but it's always truthful. You get drawn into the world of these characters - you don't approve of it, but Real Men just shows you how it is."

Cast

Main cast
 Ben Daniels as DI Matthew Fenton
 Charles Dale as DS Barry Grimes
 Ewan Stewart as Alistair Jackson
 Zoe Telford as Christina Leith
 Christine Tremarco as DS Paula Savage
 Caroline Catz as Liz Fenton
 Harry Eden as Russell Wade
 Steve John Shepherd as Brian Marshall
 Stephen Lord as Alex Collins
 Emil Marwa as DC Daniel Norbury

Supporting cast
 Jill Baker as Julie Ferguson
 Nicola Cowper as Deborah Wade
 Anthony Flanagan as James Mulgrew
 Matthew Marsh as DCI Norton
 Selva Rasalingam as Ron Dixon
 Amanda Ryan as Greta Banham
 Desmond Bayliss as Terence Sandals
 Tom Charnock as Charley Meikle
 Sally Walsh as Joanna Collins
 Pauline Jefferson as Delores Fenton
 Faye Cook as Samantha Fenton
 Ben McGawley as Simon Fenton
 Helen Kay as Angela Jackson

Episodes

References

External links

2003 British television series debuts
2003 British television series endings
2000s British crime drama television series
2000s British television miniseries
BBC television dramas
BBC Scotland television shows
English-language television shows
Television shows set in the United Kingdom